S24 may refer to:

Aviation 
 Focke-Wulf S 24 Kiebitz, a  German sport aircraft
 Sandusky County Regional Airport, in Ohio, United States
 Sikorsky S-24, a Russian biplane bomber
 Spalinger S.24, a prototype Swiss glider

Rail and transit 
 S24 (ZVV), a line of the Zürich S-Bahn
 Hirafu Station, in Kutchan, Hokkaido, Hokkaido, Japan
 Minami-Tatsumi Station, in Osaka, Japan

Other uses 
 40S ribosomal protein S24
 County Route S24 (California), United States
 , a submarine of the Indian Navy
 S24: Avoid contact with skin, a safety phrase
 S-24 rocket, a Soviet rocket
 , a submarine of the United States Navy